Arzoo is a 1965 Bollywood film directed by Ramanand Sagar. It stars Rajendra Kumar, Sadhana and Feroz Khan in the lead roles. The movie was one of the blockbuster movie of 1965 and it was 4th grossing movie of that year . Arzoo is the story of a love that triumphed over life and fate. The theme of "hating the disabled" was also tried in Rajshri films' Ek Baar Kaho, starring Navin Nischol and Shabana Azmi.

Synopsis 

Gopal (Rajendra Kumar) is a skiing champion. He meets Usha (Sadhana) on his holidays at Jammu and Kashmir with the fake name Sarju. Then they both fall in love. One day, Usha tells Gopal that she does not like the  disabled. According to her instead of living a life of disabled, it is better to die.
After spending his holidays in Kashmir and promising Usha that he will marry her, he heads back to Delhi, where his parents and a sister, Sarla, live. Along the way, he loses his a leg in a car accident.
Gopal becomes worried. Since he remembers the words of Usha, he tries to avoid her to go away from her life.
He thinks Usha will not accept him as he is now disabled. Then he goes back to Delhi and he does not tell anything about Usha. In the meantime, Usha tries a lot to find him, but after having no sign of him, she begins to think that Gopal is in some trouble and hence unable to contact her.

Gopal's best friend, Ramesh (Feroz Khan), unknowing about his friend's love story, wants to marry Usha. After saying "no" several times, at Usha's father accepts on her behalf and Usha dutifully agrees to the marriage as well. But on the day of her wedding, a miracle happens in the form of Kashmir Houseboat owner Mamdhu (Mehmood) and initially Ramesh and then Usha finds out that Gopal and Sarju are not two persons, but one. This situation forms the climax of the movie.

Cast

Soundtrack
The music is composed by Shankar Jaikishan and lyrics penned by Hasrat Jaipuri.

Filmfare nominations 

Rajendra Kumar for Best Actor
Ramanand Sagar for Best Director
Ramanand Sagar for Best Story
Hasrat Jaipuri for Best Lyricist for the song "Aji Rooth Kar Ab Kahan Jaiyega".
Shankar - Jaikishan for Best Music Director

References

External links 
 

1965 films
1960s Hindi-language films
Films scored by Shankar–Jaikishan
Films directed by Ramanand Sagar
Films set in Jammu and Kashmir